Metilia brunnerii is a species of mantis of the family Acanthopidae.

References

Mantodea of South America
Acanthopidae
Insects described in 1871